Vexillum modestum is a species of small sea snail, marine gastropod mollusk in the family Costellariidae, the ribbed miters.

Description
The length of the shell attains 17 mm.

Distribution
This marine species occurs off the Philippines.

References

 Steyn, D. G.; Lussi, M. (2005). Offshore Shells of Southern Africa: A pictorial guide to more than 750 Gastropods. Published by the authors. pp. i–vi, 1–289.
 Gori, S.; Rosado, J.; Salisbury, R. A. (2019). Costellariidae (Gastropoda) from Dhofar, Oman with descriptions of eight new species and notes on Vexillum appelii (Jickeli, 1874). Acta Conchyliorum. 18: 25-48.
 Marrow M.P. (2019). Seven new species of Vexillum (Gastropoda: Costellariidae) from Western Australia. Acta Conchyliorum. 19: 77-94.
page(s): pl. 1 figs 5, 8

External links
 Reeve, L. A. (1844-1845). Monograph of the genus Mitra. In: Conchologia Iconica, or, illustrations of the shells of molluscous animals, vol. 2, pl. 1-39 and unpaginated text. L. Reeve & Co., London
 Adams, A. (1853). Description of fifty-two new species of the genus Mitra, from the Cumingian collection. Proceedings of the Zoological Society of London. (1851) 19: 132-141
  Liénard, Élizé. Catalogue de la faune malacologique de l'île Maurice et de ses dépendances comprenant les îles Seychelles, le groupe de Chagos composé de Diego-Garcia, Six-îles, Pèros-Banhos, Salomon, etc., l'île Rodrigues, l'île de Cargados ou Saint-Brandon. J. Tremblay, 1877.
  Cernohorsky, Walter Oliver. The Mitridae of Fiji; The veliger vol. 8 (1965)

modestum
Gastropods described in 1845